The boys' 200 metre backstroke event in swimming at the 2014 Summer Youth Olympics took place on 22 August at the Nanjing Olympic Sports Centre in Nanjing, China.

Results

Heats
The heats were held at 10:00.

Final
The final was held at 18:04.

References

Swimming at the 2014 Summer Youth Olympics